The Indianapolis Ice were a minor league professional ice hockey team based in Indianapolis, Indiana, that played in the International Hockey League from 1988 to 1999 and in the Central Hockey League from 1999 to 2004. Their original home arena was Fairgrounds Coliseum (then known as the Pepsi Coliseum) at the Indiana State Fairgrounds, though they later moved to Market Square Arena. After Market Square Arena closed, the Ice played some games at the Conseco Fieldhouse in downtown Indianapolis. Their major rivals during the 1990s were the Fort Wayne Komets.

This team was replaced by a team in the United States Hockey League called the Indiana Ice following the 2003–04 season, while they relocated to Topeka, Kansas, to become the Topeka Tarantulas.

The Ice won the 1990 Turner Cup and the 2000 Ray Miron Cup.

Players

Season-by-season records
Note: GP = Games played, W = Wins, L = Losses, T = Ties, OTL = Overtime Losses, Pts = Points, GF = Goals for, GA = Goals against, PIM = Penalties in minutes

IHL Ice

CHL Ice

References

External links

 
Ice hockey clubs established in 1988
Sports clubs disestablished in 2004
Hartford Whalers minor league affiliates
New York Islanders minor league affiliates
Chicago Blackhawks minor league affiliates
Ice hockey teams in Indiana
1988 establishments in Indiana
2004 disestablishments in Indiana